Starman was a comic book published by DC Comics between 1994 and 2001. It was created by James Robinson and Tony Harris, starring their creation of Jack Knight, son of the Golden Age Starman. The comic featured cameos from several established DC characters, such as Batman and Superman, but also had a large ensemble cast made up of established characters and new creations.

The Knights

The Mists

The O'Dares
The O'Dares are the children of the original Starman's policeman ally, Billy "Red" O'Dare (who only appears briefly in the series and soon died due to liver problems caused by drinking). Each of them has inherited their father's red hair, and have joined the police force to carry on the family tradition and to protect Opal City. In the fulfillment of this commitment they come to the attention of the new Starman.

The two female members of the O'Dare family, Faith and Hope, are presumably joined by Charity following her engagement to Mason.

Starman Annual #1 indicates the O'Dare family survives into the far future as the "Dares"; noted for law enforcement on a far-off planet ruled by the beloved Shade.

Supporting heroes

Notable Opal City residents

Enemies

Starman (1990 comic) characters, List of
Starman (DC Comics)